João Vale de Almeida (born 29 January 1957 in Lisbon) is a former senior European diplomat and Portuguese national.

Vale de Almeida was Ambassador of the European Union to the United Nations from 2015 to 2019 and Ambassador of the European Union to the United States from 2010 to 2014. He was appointed “the first head of the future EU delegation to the United Kingdom of Great Britain and Northern Ireland” on 1 February 2020.

Biography

Vale de Almeida read history at the University of Lisbon before pursuing further studies in journalism and management in France, Japan, the United Kingdom and the United States. After working as a journalist for seven years, in 1982 he joined the European Commission delegation in Lisbon.

During his time in the Commission he worked under Presidents Jacques Delors, Jacques Santer, Romano Prodi and  José Manuel Barroso. Under Santer, in 1995, he became deputy chief spokesman for the EC. In 1997 he was promoted Director for Information, Communication, Culture and Audiovisual.

When EC President Romano Prodi took office in 1999, Vale de Almeida was a member of his transition team before being nominated as director for Education and Culture.

Between 2004 and 2009, Vale de Almeida was the Head of Cabinet (Chief of staff and principal adviser) for EC President José Manuel Barroso. He accompanied Barroso in all European Council meetings and ensured coordination with the private offices of Heads of State and Government in all 28 Member States of the EU. He was also the President’s Personal Representative for the negotiations on the Treaty of Lisbon and acted as his personal representative (sherpa) for G8 and G20 summits.

From November 2009 until July 2010 he served as Director-General for External Relations of the European Commission.

Vale de Almeida then served as the first Ambassador of the European Union to the United States of America, from 2010 to 2014, after the Treaty of Lisbon increased the delegation's powers to speak for the whole of the EU (previously, they represented only the Commission). In Washington, he actively engaged in strengthening EU/U.S. relations and was critical to the launching of negotiations of the Transatlantic Trade and Investment Partnership agreement (TTIP).

From 2015 to 2019, Vale de Almeida was the European Union Ambassador to the United Nations.

Since February 1 2020, Vale de Almeida has been the European Union's Ambassador to the UK and has been recognised by the UK as an Ambassador as of 5 May 2021. 

Vale de Almeida retired on 31 January 2023.

Honours and decorations
 Grand Cross of the Order of Prince Henry
 Cross of Merit, Order pro Merito Melitensi.

See also
 European Union and the United Nations
 EU Delegation to the UK

References

External links
 Ambassador's Biography, Delegation of the European Union to the United Nations
 João Vale de Almeida: “Nações Unidas são mais precisas hoje do que há trinta anos”, Observador(12 Abril 2016)
 External relations role for João Vale de Almeida, European Voice (3 June 2009)
 Noticias Magazine, Noticias Sunday Magazine (29 November 2015)
 Vale de Almeida – A Superb Diplomat with Portuguese Passion, Portuguese American Journal (5 February 2015)	
  Interview: João Vale de Almeida, European Union Ambassador to United States, Diplomatic Courier (5 December 2014)
 Interview with Joao Vale de Almeida, EU Ambassador to the UN, UNTV Global Connection (April 2016)
 Interview with EU Ambassador João Vale de Almeida, USA Today (October 2014)
 European Union Has Power to Address Continental Problems, PBS NewsHour (October 2012)
 Ambassador João Vale de Almeida speaks at UNC, University of North Carolina - Chapel Hill (October 2013)
 Interview with Amb. João Vale de Almeida, Global Journalist (April 2014)
 João Vale de Almeida: Stay cool over war of words, says EU envoy, The Times (22 February 2020)
  EU's first ambassador to UK settles in for a testing year ahead, The Guardian (1 March 2020)
 El Brexit y el coronavirus han unido más a los Veintisiete El Mundo (9 May 2020)
 Europe Day we send a message of solidarity and friendship to British people, The Guardian (9 May 2020)
 Ist João Vale de Almeida der Brückenbauer nach der Scheidung, Die Welt (12 July 2020)
 EU Ambassador to the U.K. Sees New Momentum Toward Negotiations (16 July 2020)
EU’s first ambassador to London: "We want a Brexit deal with the UK. But the European Union is ready for No Deal", La Repubblica (12 October 2020)
 UK and EU can now dominate G7 – first ever EU ambassador to Britain hails new 'special relationship', Daily Telegraph (16 January 2021)
 COVID-19: EU warns of consequences if vaccine orders not delivered, Sky News (2 February 2021)
 EU ambassador to UK calls for end to point scoring post-Brexit, The Belfast Telegraph (11 March 2021)
 EU Ambassador to the UK João Vale de Almeida full interview with Peston, ITV (11 March 2021)

Ambassadors of the European Union to the United States
Ambassadors of the European Union to the United Nations
People from Lisbon
Portuguese diplomats
Portuguese journalists
Male journalists
University of Lisbon alumni
1957 births
Living people
Portuguese officials of the European Union
European civil servants
Recipients of the Order pro Merito Melitensi